The 1975 Speedway World Pairs Championship was the sixth FIM Speedway World Pairs Championship. The final took place in Wrocław, Poland. The championship was won by Sweden (24 points), who beat host nation Poland (23 pts) and Denmark (20 points).

Semifinal 1
  Fredericia
 May 25

Semifinal 2
  Maribor
 May 26

World final
  Wrocław, Olympic Stadium
 June 15

See also
 1975 Individual Speedway World Championship
 1975 Speedway World Team Cup
 motorcycle speedway
 1975 in sports

References

1975
World Pairs